Bird's Point may refer to:

Bird's Point, Missouri
Bird's Point, Saskatchewan